NSDC may refer to:

 National Security and Defense Council of Ukraine
 National Space Defense Center, part of United States Space Command